The Broadcasting Corporation of Niue (BCN), also known as the Niue Broadcasting Corporation, is a government-owned broadcasting corporation in Niue, which operates Television Niue and Radio Sunshine, the country's only television and radio channels. It is based in Alofi. Its general manager and chief editor is Trevor Tiakia.

Following the 2011 general election, a specific cabinet ministry for the corporation was set up. The current minister responsible for the BCN is Joan Viliamu.

Broadcasting schedule 
Television Niue is broadcast in Niuean and in English.

Radio Sunshine broadcasts in English and Niuean, over 594 kHz AM and 88.6 MHz FM, from 06:00 to 21:30.

References

External links
 Television Niue official website
 Television Niue channel on YouTube: BCN News in English and Niuean

Companies of Niue
Publicly funded broadcasters
Broadcasting in Niue
Radio stations established in 2003
State media
Mass media in Niue
Companies established in 2003